John Dennis Patrick O'Brian (August 16, 1914  – November 5, 2000) was an entertainment journalist best known for his longtime role as a television critic for New York Journal American.

Career
After the death of Dorothy Kilgallen, his colleague at the Journal American, in November 1965, O'Brian took over her old Voice of Broadway column.

Personal and death
O'Brian was married to Yvonne Johnston, who died in 1996. They were the parents of two daughters, Bridget and Kate O'Brian, who was president of Al Jazeera America.

References

External links
 *
 Finding aid to the Jack O’Brian papers at Columbia University. Rare Book & Manuscript Library.

American television critics
McCarthyism
Writers from Buffalo, New York
Writers from New York City
1914 births
2000 deaths
20th-century American writers
20th-century American journalists
American male journalists